BX3 may refer to:
BX3 (gene)
Korg CX-3, musical organ, one version being the BX-3
Bx3 (New York City bus)